In enzymology, a flavone synthase is an enzyme that catalyzes the chemical reaction

a flavanone + 2-oxoglutarate + O2  a flavone + succinate + CO2 + H2O

The 3 substrates of this enzyme are flavanone, 2-oxoglutarate, and O2, whereas its 4 products are flavone, succinate, CO2, and H2O.

This enzyme belongs to the family of oxidoreductases, specifically those acting on paired donors, with O2 as oxidant and incorporation or reduction of oxygen. The oxygen incorporated need not be derived from O2 with 2-oxoglutarate as one donor, and incorporation of one atom o oxygen into each donor.  The systematic name of this enzyme class is flavanone,2-oxoglutarate:oxygen oxidoreductase (dehydrating). This enzyme participates in flavonoid biosynthesis and isoflavonoid biosynthesis.

References

 
 
 

EC 1.14.11
Enzymes of unknown structure
Flavones metabolism